Marco Antônio Feliciano, (born February 6, 1951, in Santos), known as just Marco Antônio, is a former Brazilian footballer. He played left-back with Fluminense Football Club and the Brazil national team. He won the Football World Cup 1970, is a five-time winner of Campeonato Carioca (Rio de Janeiro State championship) and received the “Brazilian Silver Ball” in 1975 and 1976.

Clubs
?-? : Fazenda Futebol Clube (amateur club)
1968-1968 : Associação Portuguesa de Desportos
1969–1976 : Fluminense Football Club
1976–1980 : Club de Regatas Vasco da Gama
1981–1983 : Bangu Atlético Clube
1983–1984 : Botafogo de Futebol e Regatas
1989–? : Al-Arabi SC

Honours
He has 52 caps (12 non official) with the Brazil national team.

He won the Football World Cup 1970 (two games played) and played also during the Football World Cup 1974.

World champion in 1970 with the Brazil national team.
Campeonato Carioca (Rio de Janeiro State championship) in 1969, 1971, 1973 and 1975 with Fluminense Football Club; 1977 with Vasco da Gama
Taça Guanabara in 1969 and 1971 with Fluminense Football Club; 1976 and 1977 with Vasco da Gama
Cup Roca in 1971 and 1976 with Fluminense Football Club

References

External links

1951 births
Living people
Sportspeople from Santos, São Paulo
Brazilian footballers
Association football fullbacks
Fluminense FC players
CR Vasco da Gama players
Bangu Atlético Clube players
Botafogo de Futebol e Regatas players
1970 FIFA World Cup players
1974 FIFA World Cup players
1979 Copa América players
FIFA World Cup-winning players
Brazil international footballers